The 83rd World Science Fiction Convention (Worldcon) will be held in 2025.

Awards 

The awards will be announced at the convention.

Site selection 

The site of the convention will be chosen by members of the 81st World Science Fiction Convention.

 the following committees have announced bids for hosting the convention:

 Seattle, WA, USA in 2025

See also 

 Hugo Award
 Science fiction
 Speculative fiction
 World Science Fiction Society
 Worldcon

References

External links 

 
 List of current Worldcon bids

Worldcon